Murud is a town and a municipal council in Raigad district in the Indian state of Maharashtra. The Palace of Nawab is located in Murud. The palace was built in 1885 for administration purposes. The palace is still owned by the descendants of the Nawab and is a private property.

About

Murud is known for a notable beach, and for its proximity to Janjira off the coast of Rajapuri, a sea fort. Murud-Janjira is the local name for a fort situated at the coastal City of Murud, in the Raigad district of Maharashtra, India. It is notable for being the only fort along India's western coast that remained undefeated despite Dutch and English East India Company attacks.

History

Main Land to Murud Janjira.At the time they seized the fort, the Siddis were employed by the Bahamani Sultan of Ahmednagar and a Habshi, Malik Ambar (1550–1626), held a prominent position in that government. Before the rise of the Maratha sardars, the courts of the Bahamani sultanates were rent by rivalry between the Indian Muslims and the foreign Muslims, as a result of which, the Sultans began to patronize the Marathas as a third force, leading to the rise of Chatrapati Shivaji Maharaj and the Maratha Empire.
Malik Amber initially rose to great prominence as the Prime Minister of Ahmednagar. He is credited with having carried out a systematic revenue settlement of major portions of the Deccan, which formed the basis for many subsequent settlements.
When the Ahmadnagar kingdom was conquered by Bijapur and the Mughals in alliance, the Siddis switched their allegiance to the Sultanate of Bijapur; when the Bijapur kingdom was conquered by the Mughal Empire, the Habshis switched their allegiance to the Mughal Empire.
As clients of these Muslim states, the Siddis were nominally part of their navies, and fulfilled the role of defending Muslim interests in the sea, and particularly, access by sea for the Hajj and Umrah, for which reason, the interior Muslim states felt compelled to aid and rescue the Siddis from their enemies.
Despite being feudatories, first of Bijapur and then of the Mughals, the Siddis acted as if they were independent, and lived mainly by piracy on coastal shipping.
The piracy of the Siddis provoked the various local powers to attempt to suppress them, but despite efforts by the Portuguese, Dutch, English and the Marathas, the fort was never conquered. The fort thus earned a reputation for being impregnable.
The reputation may be false. Mass mobilizations by the English and Marathas were always forced off before they could complete the task by the intervention of another power, such as the Mughals, creating a diversion in order to prevent the fall of Murud-Janjira. The same happened with Goa, with the Mughals invading Maratha lands in order to divert Maratha attempts to conquer Goa.
As the Muslim powers of the interior waned in the face of rising English power, the Siddi state submitted to England under the system of Subsidiary Alliance, becoming a dependency under paramountcy of the Kings of England. HH Nawab Sidi Muhammed Khan II Sidi Ahmad Khan was the last Ruler of Murud-Janjira. A patron of arts and culture, he supported such musicians as Beenkar Abid Hussain Khan. The state continued in this condition until late 1947, when the last prince acceded his state to the Indian Union, and his state was merged into the Bombay Presidency which was later transformed into the State of Bombay and the State of Maharashtra.

In 1682, Chhatrapati Sambhaji Maharaj tried to attack Janjira. Chhatrapati Sambhaji Maharaj took shelter inside a fort near Murud built by his father, Chhatrapati Shivaji Maharaj. The fort was named as Padmadurg. It was built to control the activities of the Siddis of Murud. Chhatrapati Sambhaji Maharaj sent a commander named Kondaji Farzand inside the fort. Kondaji secretly entered the fort. Kondaji played guerilla warfare against the Siddi commander Siddi Khairiyat. Kondaji told Siddi that he had a conflict with the Maratha ruler Sambhajiraje and decided to run away from Swaraj to Murud. Chhatrapati Sambhaji Maharaj told Konaji to burn the ammunition room secretly so that the walls of the fort become weak to make it easy for the Maratha forces to enter the fort. However, Kondaji was unsuccessful in the mission and was captured. Siddi beheaded Kondaji and sent Kondaji's head to Sambhajiraje. Upon seeing the beheaded Kondaji, Chhatrapati Sambhaji Maharaj was furious. He decided to strike the fort. Sambhajiraje got 200 boats loaded with cannons to attack Murud Janjira. When Aurangzeb heard this news, he sent one of his commanders to Kalyan to divert Sambhajiraje. Sambhajiraje saved Kalyan. He moved away from Murud which made the Maratha abort the mission. The Marathas were unsuccessful against winning Murud Janjira. After this terrific and horrifying attack by Chhatrapati Sambhaji Maharaj, the Siddis were scared of the Marathas. Aurangzeb begged the Siddis to join their alliance but they were too scared.

Geography
It has an average elevation of 7 metres (26 feet).

Demographics
 India census, Murud had a population of 12,551. Males constitute 48% of the population and females 52%. In Murud, 11% of the population is under 6 years of age.

Local food productions
Seafood: prawns, surumai, pomfret, kingfish, mackerel, crab, lobster.
Vegetables: eggplant (brinjal), sweet potato, sugarcane, onions, garlic.
Cereals: rice.
Fruits: coconut, mango, watermelon, bananas, jack fruit, kokum.
Nuts: Betel nut, cashew nut.
Spices: black pepper.
Fish  surmai, rawas prons lobster octopus bombay duck(bombil)

Education
Below are the famous schools in Murud City 
Omkar Vidya Mandir
Sir.S.A.Highschool and M.L.D.College
Anjuman Islam Highschool and Degree College
Vasantrao Naik College Of Arts & Commerce
Nachiketas Public School
Suvidya Public School
Pioneer Public School
Mehboob English medium School
Vaishali Nikatan Vihoor

Hospitals
Murud Rural Hospital(F.B.Hospital)
L.K.B.Hospital
Kalyani Hospital
Muqbool Narsing Home and Hospital
Shree Clinic

Ports
Agardanda Terminal (5 km south)
Dighi Port (5 km south)

References

External links

Cities and towns in Raigad district
Talukas in Maharashtra